Henry Chambers (22 May 1865 – 12 February 1934) was a Scotland international rugby union player.

Rugby Union career

Amateur career

Chambers played rugby union for Edinburgh University.

Provincial career

He played for Edinburgh District in their inter-city match against Glasgow District on 1 December 1888.

He played for East of Scotland District in their match against West of Scotland District on 26 January 1889.

International career

Chambers was capped four times by Scotland, from 1888 to 1889.

References

1865 births
1934 deaths
Rugby union players from Melbourne
Scottish rugby union players
Scotland international rugby union players
Edinburgh University RFC players
Edinburgh District (rugby union) players
East of Scotland District players
Rugby union fullbacks